Fiesta is a 1941 American Technicolor film directed by LeRoy Prinz that was one of Hal Roach's Streamliners. The film was the motion picture debut of the Los Angeles Civic Light Opera star Anne Ayars.

The film was re-released in 1948 by Favorite Films and retitled Gaiety.

Plot summary
Don Juan Hernández's niece Cholita returns to her village from Mexico City announcing she will not marry José, her village boyfriend, bur rather the radio star Fernando Gómez who has accompanied her home.  José enlists two of his friends to pose as bandits to frighten the arrogant and cowardly Fernando and win Cholita back.

Cast
 Ann Ayars as Cholita
 Jorge Negrete as José
 Armida as Cuca
 George Givot as Fernando Gómez
 Antonio Moreno as Don Hernandez, Cholita's Uncle
 Nick Moro as Pedro
 Frank Yaconelli as Pablo
 George Humbert as Pancho
 Francisco Moreno as Paco
 Betty Bryson as Pancho's Wife
 Carlos Valadez as Oaxoco Plume Dancer
 José Arias as Leader of the Mexican Tipica Orchestra
 The Guadalajara Trio as Band
 Tipíca Orchestra of the Mexico City Police as Orchestra
 Robert C. Bruce as the Narrator

Soundtrack
 Ann Ayars - "I'll Never Forget Fiesta" (music by Nilo Meléndez, lyrics by Chet Forrest and Bob Wright)
 Jorge Negrete - "Ride Mi Caballeros"
 Armida with The Guadalajara Trio - "Never Trust a Jumping Bean" (music by Edward Ward, lyrics by Chet Forrest and Bob Wright)
 Frank Yaconelli, Earl Douglas and Nick Moro - "The Two Bravest Hombres in All Mexico" (written by Johnny Lange and Lew Porter
 Jorge Negrete - "Quien Sabe" (music by Edward Ward, lyrics by Chet Forrest and Bob Wright)
 Jorge Negrete and Ann Ayars - "Quien Sabe" (reprise) (music by Edward Ward, lyrics by Chet Forrest and Bob Wright)
 Dancers and Tipíca Orchestra of the Mexico City Police, led by José Arias - Gypsy Dance
 Jorge Negrete and The Guadalajara Trio - "El Relajo" (written by Lamberto Leyva, Jesús Castillón and Oscar Felix)
 Ann Ayars and The Guadalajara Trio - "La Golondrina" (written by Narcisco Sarradell)

References

External links
 
 
 
 
 

1941 films
American romantic comedy films
1941 musical comedy films
1941 romantic comedy films
Hal Roach Studios
American romantic musical films
1940s romantic musical films
Films set in Mexico
United Artists films
Films scored by Edward Ward (composer)
Films directed by LeRoy Prinz
1940s English-language films
1940s American films